Minima! is a Japanese manga series written and illustrated by Machiko Sakurai. It was cancelled in February 2008.

Manga
The manga was licensed for an English-language release in North America by Del Rey Manga. As of February 2009, Del Rey Manga had released 4 bound volumes of the manga.

Volume list

Reception
Mania.com's Nadia Oxford and About.com's Deb Aoki comments on the manga's realistic portrayal of a high school girl who is a victim of bullying. Pop Culture Shock's Katherine Dacey criticises the manga artist's artwork saying that Sakurai "has a limited repertoire of character designs, and a tendency to draw vaguely alien faces with bulging eyes and foreheads." Casey Brienza at Anime News Network commends the manga's ability to seamlessly "shift from human-sized perspectives to toy-sized ones and back again".

References

External links
Official Betsufure Minima! website 

Shōjo manga
2006 manga
Comedy anime and manga